In computer science, consistent hashing is a special kind of hashing technique such that when a hash table is resized, only  keys need to be remapped on average where  is the number of keys and  is the number of slots. In contrast, in most traditional hash tables, a change in the number of array slots causes nearly all keys to be remapped because the mapping between the keys and the slots is defined by a modular operation.

History

The term "consistent hashing" was introduced by David Karger et al. at MIT for use in distributed caching, particularly for the web. This academic paper from 1997 in Symposium on Theory of Computing introduced the term "consistent hashing" as a way of distributing requests among a changing population of web servers. Each slot is then represented by a server in a distributed system or cluster. The addition of a server and the removal of a server (during scalability or outage) requires only  items to be re-shuffled when the number of slots (i.e. servers) change. The authors mention linear hashing and its ability to handle sequential server addition and removal, while consistent hashing allows servers to be added and removed in an arbitrary order.
 The paper was later re-purposed to address technical challenge of keeping track of a file in peer-to-peer networks such as a distributed hash table.

Teradata used this technique in their distributed database, released in 1986, although they did not use this term. Teradata still uses the concept of a hash table to fulfill exactly this purpose. Akamai Technologies was founded in 1998 by the scientists Daniel Lewin and F. Thomson Leighton (co-authors of the article coining "consistent hashing"). In Akamai's content delivery network, consistent hashing is used to balance the load within a cluster of servers, while a stable marriage algorithm is used to balance load across clusters.

Consistent hashing has also been used to reduce the impact of partial system failures in large web applications to provide robust caching without incurring the system-wide fallout of a failure. Consistent hashing is also the cornerstone of distributed hash tables (DHTs), which employ hash values to partition a keyspace across a distributed set of nodes, then construct an overlay network of connected nodes that provide efficient node retrieval by key.

Rendezvous hashing, designed in 1996, is a simpler and more general technique . It achieves the goals of consistent hashing using the very different highest random weight (HRW) algorithm.

Basic Technique

However, when a server is added or removed during outage or scaling (when  changes), all the BLOBs in every server should be reassigned and moved due to rehashing, but this operation is expensive.

Consistent hashing was designed to avoid the problem of having to reassign every BLOB when a server is added or removed throughout the cluster. The central idea is, we use a hash function that randomly maps both the BLOB and servers to a unit circle, usually  radians. For example,  (where  is hash of a BLOB or server's identifier, like IP address or UUID). Each BLOB is then assigned to the next server that appears on the circle in clockwise order. This provides an even distribution of BLOBs to servers. But, more importantly, if a server fails and is removed from the circle, only the BLOBs that were mapped to the failed server need to be reassigned to the next server in clockwise order. Likewise, if a new server is added, it is added to the unit circle, and only the BLOBs mapped to that server need to be reassigned.

Importantly, when a server is added or removed, the vast majority of the BLOBs maintain their prior server assignments, and the addition of  server only causes  fraction of the BLOBs to relocate. Although the process of moving BLOBs across cache servers in the cluster depends on the context, commonly, the newly added cache server identifies its "successor" and moves all the BLOBs, whose mapping belongs to this server (i.e. whose hash value is less than that of the new server), from it. However, in the case of web page caches, in most implementations there is no involvement of moving or copying, assuming the cached BLOB is small enough. When a request hits a newly added cache server, a cache miss happens and a request to the actual web server is made and the BLOB is cached locally for future requests. The redundant BLOBs on the previously used cache servers would be removed as per the cache eviction policies.

Implementation
Let  and  be the hash functions used for the BLOB and server's unique identifier respectively. In practice, a binary search tree (BST) is used to dynamically maintain the  within a cluster or hashring, and to find the successor or minimum within the BST, tree traversal is used.
Inserting  into the cluster
If  is larger than all of the s, the BLOB is placed in the server with smallest  value.
Deleting  from the cluster
If  has no successor, remove the BLOB from the smallest of the s.
Insert a server into cluster
If  is largest of all the s, move the relevant BLOBs from the smallest of the s into .
Delete a server from cluster
If  doesn't have a successor, move the BLOBs into the smallest of the s.

Variance Reduction

To avoid skewness of multiple nodes within the radian, which happen due to lack of randomness in the distribution of the servers within the cluster, multiple labels are used. Those duplicate labels are called "virtual nodes" i.e. multiple labels which point to a single "real" label or server within the cluster. The amount of virtual nodes or duplicate labels used for a particular server within a cluster is called the "weight" of that particular server.

Practical Extensions

A number of extensions to the basic technique are needed for effectively using consistent hashing for load balancing in practice. In the basic scheme above, if a server fails, all its BLOBs are reassigned to the next server in clockwise order, potentially doubling the load of that server. This may not be desirable. To ensure a more even redistribution of BLOBs on server failure, each server can be hashed to multiple locations on the unit circle. When a server fails, the BLOBs assigned to each of its replicas on the unit circle will get reassigned to a different server in clockwise order, thus redistributing the BLOBs more evenly. Another extension concerns a situation where a single BLOB gets "hot" and is accessed a large number of times and will have to be hosted in multiple servers. In this situation, the BLOB may be assigned to multiple contiguous servers by traversing the unit circle in clockwise order. A more complex practical consideration arises when two BLOBs are hashed near each other in the unit circle and both get "hot" at the same time. In this case, both BLOBs will use the same set of contiguous servers in the unit circle. This situation can be ameliorated by each BLOB choosing a different hash function for mapping servers to the unit circle.

Comparison with Rendezvous Hashing and other alternatives 
Rendezvous hashing, designed in 1996, is a simpler and more general technique, and permits fully distributed agreement on a set of  options out of a possible set of  options. It can in fact be shown that consistent hashing is a special case of rendezvous hashing. Because of its simplicity and generality, Rendezvous Hashing is now being used in place of Consistent Hashing in many applications.

If key values will always increase monotonically, an alternative approach using a hash table with monotonic keys may be more suitable than consistent hashing.

Complexity 

The  is an average cost for redistribution of keys and the  complexity for consistent hashing comes from the fact that a binary search among nodes angles is required to find the next node on the ring.

Examples 
Known examples of consistent hashing use include:
 Couchbase automated data partitioning 
 OpenStack's Object Storage Service Swift
 Partitioning component of Amazon's storage system Dynamo
 Data partitioning in Apache Cassandra
 Data partitioning in Voldemort
 Akka's consistent hashing router
 Riak, a distributed key-value database
 Gluster, a network-attached storage file system
 Akamai content delivery network
 Discord chat application
 Chord algorithm

References

External links 
 Understanding Consistent hashing
 Consistent hashing by Michael Nielsen on June 3, 2009
 Consistent Hashing, Danny Lewin, and the Creation of Akamai
 Jump Consistent Hashing: A Fast, Minimal Memory, Consistent Hash Algorithm
 Rendezvous Hashing: an alternative to Consistent Hashing
 Implementations in various languages:
 C
 C++
 C#
 Erlang
 Go
 Java
  PHP
 Ruby
 Python
 Python (again)
 Perl
 Perl6

Hashing